Caryota elegans is a species of palm trees.

References 

 LA BELGIQUE HORTICOLE ANNALES DE BOTANIQUE ET D'HORTICULTURE PAR Édouard MORREN, 1876 (full text (French))
 Reveal, J.L.  2012.  A divulgation of ignored or forgotten binomials.  Phytoneuron 2012–28, pages 1–64

External links 
 Caryota elegans at the World Checklist of Selected Plant Families
 Caryota elegans at Tropicos

elegans
Plants described in 1875